The Comeback Trail is a 1982 film directed by Harry Hurwitz. It stars Chuck McCann and, in his final screen role, Buster Crabbe. It was filmed in 1974. A remake of the film premiered in 2020.

The film features several cameos of people playing themselves, such as Hugh Hefner, Henny Youngman and Irwin Corey.

Plot

Two down-on-their-luck film producers, Eastman and Kodac, decide to make a Western film with Duke Montana, a veteran cowboy star, in hopes that he will die and they will collect the insurance money.

Principal cast

References

External links 

1982 films
Films shot in New Mexico
1982 comedy films
Films directed by Harry Hurwitz
Films set in 1974
American comedy films
1980s English-language films
1980s American films